Healin' Good Pretty Cure is the seventeenth television anime series in Izumi Todo's Pretty Cure franchise, produced by Asahi Broadcasting Corporation and animated by Toei Animation. The series aired in Japan from February 2, 2020, to February 21, 2021, succeeding Star Twinkle PreCure in its initial time slot, and replaced by Tropical-Rouge! PreCure. The opening theme is "Healin' Good Pretty Cure Touch!!" (ヒーリングっど♥プリキュア Touch!!) by Rie Kitagawa, while the first ending theme is "Miracle and a Link Ring!" (ミラクルっと Link Ring！) by Machico. From episode 20 until the finale, "Everybody☆Healin' Good Day!" (エビバディ☆ヒーリングッデイ！) by Kanako Miyamoto serves as the second ending theme. Toei Animation and Guild Studio use Unreal Engine 4 for the ending animations. On April 20, 2020, Toei Animation announced that episode 13 and onward would be delayed until further notice due to the COVID-19 pandemic. However, Toei Animation later announced they would continue airing new episodes starting on June 28.



Episode list

Notes

References

Healin' Good PreCure